Liga 1 U-19 is a junior level league of participating clubs in the Liga 1. From 2008 to 2014, this youth league was an under-21 league known as the Indonesia Super League U-21. From the 2017 season onwards, the competition age limit decreased from under-21 to under-19. Building and managing a complete U-19 team is one of the requirements for clubs participating in the Liga 1, as regulated by the Football Association of Indonesia (PSSI). From 2019, the league is replaced by Elite Pro Academy.

Competition format 
Differently than the main Liga 1, this junior competition, divided into four acts consist of two group stages and two knockout rounds, which is the semifinals and final. On the first stage, the 18 participating clubs are divided into three groups each containing six clubs, the top two teams of each group and the two best third place will advance to the second stage. The second stage consists of two groups containing four teams in each group, the best team from each group and the best runner-up will advance to the semifinals. The winner of the semifinals will advance to the final to battle for the championship.

Champions

Awards

See also
 Liga 1
 Indonesian football league system

Notes

References

External links
Official Website

 
U-21
U21